Roan Carneiro Pereira (born 2 June 1978) is a Brazilian retired professional mixed martial artist who most recently competed in the Welterweight division of the Ultimate Fighting Championship. A professional competitor since 2000, Carneiro was the winner of the Battlegrounds MMA's one-night, eight-man tournament, in which he won three fights to become the champion, and has also competed for DEEP.

Mixed martial arts career

Early career
Carneiro began fighting in MMA professionally in 2000 at the age of 22 in his native Brazil. One of his earliest losses was to future longtime UFC Middleweight Champion Anderson Silva.  He amassed a record of 10-5 before signing with the Ultimate Fighting Championship.

Ultimate Fighting Championship
In April 2007, Carneiro debuted with the UFC. He faced Rich Clementi in his debut and won the fight via unanimous decision.

Carneiro then faced Jon Fitch at UFC Fight Night 10. He lost the fight via submission in the second round.

In his third UFC fight, Carneiro faced Tony DeSouza at UFC 79 on 29 December 2007. He won the fight via TKO in the second round.

Carneiro next faced Kevin Burns at UFC 85 on 7 June 2008. He lost the fight via submission in the second round.

For his fifth UFC fight, Carneiro faced Ryo Chonan at UFC 88 on 6 September 2008. He lost the fight via split decision. Following this loss, he was released from his contract.

Battleground MMA
After fighting sporadically for independent promotions between 2009 and 2013, Carneiro signed to compete in a one-night, eight-man tournament for BattleGrounds MMA on 3 October 2014.  In the quarterfinals, he defeated Randall Wallace by submission in the first round.  In the semifinals, he defeated Trey Houston by TKO in the second round.  In the finals, Carneiro defeated Brock Larson by unanimous decision to be crowned the tournament champion.

UFC return
In December 2014, it was announced that Carneiro had been re-signed with the UFC. In his return fight, Carneiro replaced Caio Magalhaes against Mark Muñoz on 28 February 2015 at UFC 184. He won the fight via technical submission from a rear-naked choke in the first round.

Carneiro was expected to face Gegard Mousasi on 27 September 2015 at UFC Fight Night 75. However, Carneiro was forced to pull out of the bout in mid-August with an elbow injury and was replaced by Uriah Hall.

Carneiro faced Derek Brunson on 21 February 2016 at UFC Fight Night 83. He lost the fight via TKO in the first round.

Carneiro next faced Kenny Robertson on 17 September 2016 at UFC Fight Night 94. He won the fight via split decision.

As the last fight of his prevailing contract, Carneiro faced Ryan LaFlare on 11 February 2017 at UFC 208. He lost the fight by unanimous decision. UFC elected not to renew Carneiro's contract, making him a free agent.

Post-UFC
Carneiro then signed a non-exclusive contract with Absolute Championship Akhmat, losing the first two fights against Aslambek Saidov and Husein Kushagov.

Carneiro returned to action on 30 November 2019 in Auckland, New Zealand where he won WKN Middleweight MMA title by submission in the first round against previously 15-fight undefeated Kelvin Joseph in the main event of WKN World Cup 2019.

Acting
Carneiro had an acting role as fictional MMA fighter Marco Santos in the MMA movie Warrior.

Personal life
Carneiro has a son and a daughter.

Championships and accomplishments

Mixed martial arts
 BattleGrounds MMA
 BattleGrounds MMA Grand Prix Championship
World Kickboxing Network
WKN Middleweight MMA title

Brazilian jiu-jitsu
 Abu Dhabi Brazilian Trials Winner
 Pan American Champion
 Rio de Janeiro State Champion

Mixed martial arts record

|-
| Win
| align=center | 22–13
| Kelvin Joseph
| Submission (rear-naked choke)
| WKN World Cup 2019
| 
| align=center | 1
| align=center | 4:50
| Auckland, New Zealand
| 
|-
| Loss
| align=center | 21–13
| Husein Kushagov
| Decision (split)
|ACA 91: Agujev vs. Silvério
|
|align=center|3
|align=center|5:00
|Grozny, Russia
|
|-
| Loss
| align=center | 21–12
| Aslambek Saidov
| Decision (unanimous)
| |ACB 81: Saidov vs. Carneiro 
| 
| align=center | 3
| align=center | 5:00
| Dubai, United Arab Emirates
|
|-
| Loss
| align=center | 21–11
| Ryan LaFlare
| Decision (unanimous)
| UFC 208
| 
| align=center | 3
| align=center | 5:00
| Brooklyn, New York, United States
|
|-
| Win
| align=center | 21–10
| Kenny Robertson
| Decision (split)
| UFC Fight Night: Poirier vs. Johnson
| 
| align=center | 3
| align=center | 5:00
| Hidalgo, Texas, United States
| 
|-
| Loss
| align=center | 20–10
| Derek Brunson
| TKO (punches)
| UFC Fight Night: Cowboy vs. Cowboy
| 
| align=center | 1
| align=center | 2:38
| Pittsburgh, Pennsylvania, United States
|
|-
| Win
| align=center | 20–9
| Mark Muñoz
| Technical Submission (rear-naked choke)
| UFC 184
| 
| align=center | 1
| align=center | 1:40
| Los Angeles, California, United States
| 
|-
| Win
| align=center | 19–9
| Brock Larson
| Decision (unanimous)
| rowspan=3|BattleGrounds MMA 5: O.N.E.
| rowspan=3|
| align=center | 3
| align=center | 5:00
| rowspan=3|Tulsa, Oklahoma, United States
| 
|-
| Win
| align=center | 18–9
| Trey Houston
| TKO (punches)
| align=center | 2
| align=center | 2:11
| 
|-
| Win
| align=center | 17–9
| Randall Wallace
| Submission (straight armbar)
| align=center | 1
| align=center | 3:29
| 
|-
| Win
| align=center | 16–9
| Sean Huffman
| Submission (rear-naked choke)
| Wild Bill's Fight Night 60
| 
| align=center | 1
| align=center | 1:59
| Duluth, Georgia, United States
| 
|-
| Win
| align=center | 15–9
| Jung Hwan Cha
| Technical Submission (armbar)
| Road FC 7: Recharged
| 
| align=center | 1
| align=center | 4:41
| Seoul, South Korea
| 
|-
| Loss
| align=center | 14–9
| Tommy Depret
| Submission (armbar)
| United Glory 13
| 
| align=center | 1
| align=center | 2:36
| Charleroi, Belgium
| 
|-
| Win
| align=center | 14–8
| Luis Ramos
| Decision (unanimous)
| United Glory 12
| 
| align=center | 3
| align=center | 5:00
| Amsterdam, Netherlands
| 
|-
| Win
| align=center | 13–8
| Jorge Patino
| Decision (unanimous)
| Shine Fights 2: ATT vs. The World
| 
| align=center | 3
| align=center | 5:00
| Miami, Florida, United States
|
|-
| Loss
| align=center | 12–8
| Ryo Chonan
| Decision (split)
| UFC 88
| 
| align=center | 3
| align=center | 5:00
| Atlanta, Georgia, United States
|
|-
| Loss
| align=center | 12–7
| Kevin Burns
| Submission (triangle choke)
| UFC 85
| 
| align=center | 2
| align=center | 2:53
| London, England
|
|-
| Win
| align=center | 12–6
| Tony DeSouza
| TKO (punches)
| UFC 79
| 
| align=center | 2
| align=center | 3:33
| Las Vegas, Nevada, United States
|
|-
| Loss
| align=center | 11–6
| Jon Fitch
| Submission (rear-naked choke)
| UFC Fight Night: Stout vs. Fisher
| 
| align=center | 2
| align=center | 1:07
| Hollywood, Florida, United States
|
|-
| Win
| align=center | 11–5
| Rich Clementi
| Decision (unanimous)
| UFC Fight Night: Stevenson vs. Guillard
| 
| align=center | 3
| align=center | 5:00
| Las Vegas, Nevada, United States
|
|-
| Loss
| align=center | 10–5
| Fabio Negao
| Decision (unanimous)
| Cla Fighting Championships 1
| 
| align=center | 3
| align=center | 5:00
| São Paulo, Brazil
|
|-
| Win
| align=center | 10–4
| Yoshitomo Watanabe
| Submission (arm-triangle choke)
| Show Fight 5
| 
| align=center | 1
| align=center | 1:36
| São Paulo, Brazil
|
|-
| Win
| align=center | 9–4
| Daisuke Ishii
| Decision (unanimous)
| DEEP: 25 Impact
| 
| align=center | 3
| align=center | 5:00
| Tokyo, Japan
|
|-
| Loss
| align=center | 8–4
| Leonardo Lucio Nascimento
| TKO (corner stoppage)
| rowspan=3|WCFC: No Guts No Glory
| rowspan=3|
| align=center | 1
| align=center | 5:00
| rowspan=3|Manchester, England
| 
|-
| Win
| align=center | 8–3
| Matt Horwich
| Decision (split)
| align=center | 3
| align=center | 5:00
| 
|-
| Win
| align=center | 7–3
| Gregory Bouchelaghem
| Decision (unanimous)
| align=center | 3
| align=center | 5:00
| 
|-
| Win
| align=center | 6–3
| Claudio Mattos
| Submission
| Fight for Respect 1
| 
| align=center | N/A
| align=center | N/A
| Lisbon, Portugal
|
|-
| Loss
| align=center | 5–3
| Ryo Chonan
| TKO (doctor stoppage)
| DEEP: 18th Impact
| 
| align=center | 3
| align=center | 2:15
| Tokyo, Japan
|
|-
| Win
| align=center | 5–2
| Paul Jenkins
| Submission (rear-naked choke)
| Shooto: Switzerland 2
| 
| align=center | 1
| align=center | N/A
| Zurich, Switzerland
|
|-
| Win
| align=center | 4–2
| Rodrigo Ruas
| Decision (unanimous)
| Absolute FC: Brazil 1
| 
| align=center | 3
| align=center | 5:00
| Nova Friburgo, Brazil
|
|-
| Win
| align=center | 3–2
| Adriano Verdelli
| Submission (anaconda choke)
| Meca World Vale Tudo 9
| 
| align=center | 1
| align=center | 1:11
| Rio de Janeiro, Brazil
|
|-
| Win
| align=center | 2–2
| Sebastian Borean
| Submission (choke)
| Argentina Fighting Championships 1
| 
| align=center | 1
| align=center | N/A
| Buenos Aires, Argentina
|
|-
| Win
| align=center | 1–2
| Carlos Esponja
| TKO (submission to punches)
| Meca World Vale Tudo 7
| 
| align=center | 1
| align=center | N/A
| Curitiba, Brazil
|
|-
| Loss
| align=center | 0–2
| Anderson Silva
| TKO (submission to punches)
| Meca World Vale Tudo 6
| 
| align=center | 1
| align=center | 5:33
| Curitiba, Brazil
|
|-
| Loss
| align=center | 0–1
| Marcelo Belmiro
| Decision (unanimous)
| Heroes 1
| 
| align=center | 1
| align=center | 10:00
| Rio de Janeiro, Brazil
|

See also
 List of current UFC fighters
 List of male mixed martial artists

References

External links
 
 

1978 births
Living people
Brazilian male mixed martial artists
Welterweight mixed martial artists
Mixed martial artists utilizing Brazilian jiu-jitsu
Brazilian practitioners of Brazilian jiu-jitsu
People awarded a black belt in Brazilian jiu-jitsu
Sportspeople from Rio de Janeiro (city)
Ultimate Fighting Championship male fighters